The sheriff is the oldest secular office under the Crown.  Formerly the sheriff was the principal law enforcement officer in the county but over the centuries most of the responsibilities associated with the post have been transferred elsewhere or are now defunct so that its functions are now largely ceremonial.  The sheriff changes every April.

The post of Sheriff of Cumberland existed from the creation of the county in the twelfth century up until 1974 when the administrative and ceremonial or geographic county of Cumberland became part of Cumbria.

List of sheriffs

Sheriffs of Cumberland have included:

1100–1199

1200–1299

1300–1399

1400–1499

1500–1599

1600–1699

1700–1799

1800–1899

1900–1973

References
 The History of the Worthies of England Volume 1

Bibliography
  (with amendments of 1963, Public Record Office)

 
Cumberland
Local government in Cumbria